Duckman: Private Dick/Family Man is an American animated sitcom created and developed by Everett Peck, based on characters he created in his 1990 one-shot comic book published by Dark Horse Comics. Duckman aired on the USA Network from March 5, 1994, through September 6, 1997, for 4 seasons. It follows Eric Tiberius Duckman (voiced by Jason Alexander), a private detective who lives with his family.

After airing in syndication, the series gained a cult following. Spin-off media include volume DVDs released from 2008 to 2009, a comic book collection released by Topps between 1994 and 1996, a Complete Series DVD set released in 2018, and a video game entitled Duckman: The Graphic Adventures of a Private Dick for Microsoft Windows. The series was listed among IGN'''s "Top 100 Best Animated TV Shows" in 2009 and received three nominations at the Primetime Emmy Awards.

Plot

In a universe where humans and anthropomorphic animals coexist, the series centers on Eric Tiberius Duckman (voiced by Jason Alexander), a widowed, lewd, self-hating, egocentric anthropomorphic duck who lives with his family in Los Angeles (as mentioned in the episode "Bev Takes a Holiday") and works as a private detective. The tagline of the show, seen in the opening credits, is "Private Dick/Family Man".

Main characters include Cornfed (voiced by Gregg Berger), a pig who is Duckman's Joe Friday–esque business partner and best friend; Ajax (voiced by Dweezil Zappa), Duckman's eldest, slow-witted teenage son; Charles (voiced by Dana Hill and later Pat Musick) and Mambo (voiced by E. G. Daily), Duckman's genius conjoined twins whose heads share a body; Bernice (voiced by Nancy Travis), the identical twin of Duckman's presumed-dead wife Beatrice, a fanatical fitness buff who hates Duckman with a passion; and Grandma-ma (voiced by Travis), Duckman's comatose, immensely flatulent mother-in-law.

Recurring characters include Agnes Delrooney (voiced by Brian Doyle-Murray), Grandma-ma's doppelgänger who kidnaps her and poses as her until towards the end of the final season; Fluffy and Uranus (voiced by Musick), Duckman's two Care Bear–esque teddy-bear office assistants; George Herbert Walker "King" Chicken (voiced by Tim Curry), a supervillain who schemes to ruin Duckman's life; Beverly (voiced by Travis), Beatrice and Bernice's long-lost sister; and Gecko (voiced by Frank Welker), Duckman's pet dog (which he had stolen).

In the final episode, four couples (Dr. Stein/Dana Reynard, Duckman/Honey, King Chicken/Bernice, Cornfed/Beverly) get married – the last three in a joint ceremony. The kids, Fluffy and Uranus, and a number of characters from previous episodes are in attendance. As the ceremonies draw to a close, Beatrice (Duckman's supposedly deceased wife) appears and shocks the entire crowd. When Duckman asks how she can still be alive, Beatrice indicates Cornfed always knew. Cornfed says, "I can explain." The show then ends with "To be continued...?" superimposed on the screen. In regards to this cliffhanger, Duckman writer Michael Markowitz offered the following shortly after the series came to an end: "We never formally planned Part II... and I'll never tell what I personally had in mind. I'm hoping to leave it to my heirs, for the inevitable day when Duckman is revived by future generations." On August 13, 2015, Markowitz posted on his Twitter page in response to a question from a fan about the cliffhanger, "Was then (& now) an #XFiles fan (bride in ep was Dana Reynard, a Mulder-Scully hint) so involved gov't coverup of aliens".

Production
The series consists of 70 episodes that aired on Saturday nights from 1994 to 1997 on the USA Network. It later reran on Comedy Central in the United States from 2000 to 2006. In Spain, it aired on Canal+ in the 90s and on Cartoon Network alongside The Critic through a nightly block aimed at adults in the early 2000s, with dubbing made in that country. In the United Kingdom, it aired on Sky 1 and BBC Two, and in Canada, it is a former program on MTV2 and Teletoon. The initial showrunners were Peck, Reno and Osborn, and the show was produced in association with Paramount Network Television. Klasky Csupo animated and produced the show; around the same time, they were also producing Aaahh!!! Real Monsters on Nickelodeon. In later years, the show running duties went to David Misch and Michael Markowitz. Creator and executive producer Everett Peck was with the show for its entire run. Producer Gene Laufenberg was with the show for most of its run. Scott Wilk and Todd Yvega created original music for the series, including the theme. The first season also featured excerpts from Frank Zappa's published catalog (Frank Zappa died several months prior to this series' premiere).

Episodes

Merchandise

Comic books
Between 1994 and 1996 various comic books were published by Topps based on the TV series. These were largely written and drawn by others, including Jay Lynch, Scott Shaw! and Craig Yoe. Topps also reprinted Peck's original 1990 Duckman comic.

Home media
In January 2008, TVShowsOnDVD.com reported that Duckman would be coming to region 1 DVD. Details followed in May, when it was announced that the first release in the series would be the first two seasons, 22 combined episodes on three discs, on September 16, 2008. The final two seasons, 48 episodes, were released on a seven-disc set on January 6, 2009. Both DVD sets were released by CBS DVD/Paramount Home Entertainment.

With the DVD releases, many episodes were edited to remove copyrighted music because of royalty issues, and as a result they differ somewhat from the aired TV episodes though Everett Peck was involved in the process of the DVD releases and he felt the most important music was preserved.

The Complete Series DVD was released on February 6, 2018.

Video game
In May 1997, a point-and-click adventure computer game, Duckman: The Graphic Adventures of a Private Dick, was released for Microsoft Windows. In it, Duckman has become a famous detective, and a television series based on him is about to debut, but someone is pushing Duckman out of his own life and replacing him with a bigger, better, heroic Duckman. The player's goal is to help Duckman get rid of the impostor and reclaim his rightful place. A PlayStation port was also planned, but it was cancelled at the last minute.

Reception
The show was critically acclaimed. In January 2009, IGN listed Duckman as the 48th best in the Top 100 Best Animated TV Shows.

Episodes "T.V. or Not to Be", "Noir Gang", and "Duckman and Cornfed in 'Haunted Society Plumbers'" were nominated for a Primetime Emmy Award for Outstanding Animated Program in 1994, 1996, and 1997, respectively.

See also

 Duckman: The Graphic Adventures of a Private Dick Squirrel Boy''

Notes

References

External links

 
 
 
 
 
 

 
1990s American adult animated television series
1990s American sitcoms
1994 American television series debuts
1997 American television series endings
American adult animated comedy television series
American animated sitcoms
Comics about animals
Comics about ducks
Comics about pigs
Satirical comics
Comics set in the United States
Dark Horse Comics titles
English-language television shows
USA Network original programming
Fictional private investigators
Television shows based on comics
Television series by CBS Studios
Television series created by Everett Peck
Television series by Klasky Csupo
Animated television series about ducks
Animated television series about dysfunctional families
Television shows set in Los Angeles
Topps Comics titles
Television shows adapted into comics
Television shows adapted into video games